T Vulpeculae is a possible binary star system in the northern constellation of Vulpecula, near the star Zeta Cygni, close to the pair 31 Vulpeculae and 32 Vulpeculae. It is visible to the naked eye with an apparent visual magnitude that ranges around 5.75.

A well-studied Classical Cepheid variable and one of the brightest known, the apparent magnitude of T Vulpeculae ranges from 5.41 to 6.09 over a period of 4.435 days. It is a yellow-white hued supergiant of spectral type F5 Ib. The variability of T Vul was discovered in 1885 by Edwin Sawyer. Observations between 1885 and 2003 shows a small but continuous decrease in the period of variability amounting to 0.25 seconds per year.

The companion star was detected in 1992; it is an A-type main-sequence star with a class of A0.8 V and 2.1 times the Sun's mass. Orbital periods of 738 and 1,745 days have been proposed for the pair, although, as of 2015, there remains doubt as to whether this is an actual binary system.

References

Classical Cepheid variables
F-type supergiants
A-type main-sequence stars
Binary stars
Vulpecula
Durchmusterung objects
198726 
102949 
7988
Vulpeculae, T